Rocco DiSiglio, also known as Rocky DiSiglio (April 11, 1939, Newton, Massachusetts – April 3, 1966, East Boston, Massachusetts) was an American professional welterweight boxer and associate of the Patriarca crime family who was involved in armed robbery and illegal gambling.

Boxing career

Little is known about his personal life except that he was born in Newton. His professional boxing record does not even contain a birth date for him. There are also discrepancies in the spelling of his last name, both "DeSiglio" and "DiSiglio" have been used by sources. As a professional boxer he used the "DiSiglio" spelling. the correct spelling is diseglio. He also used the name "Rocky", a derivative of his given name "Rocco". As an amateur boxer before he became professional he trained with future professional boxers Anthony Veranis, Joseph Barboza, Tommy Sullivan, George W. Holden, Americo Sacramone, Edward G. Connors and Joe DeNucci. He weighed between 141 and 148 pounds. He was also a criminal associate of mafioso boxer Joseph Barboza, who would later lead Boston police to the site of his corpse.

Rocco fought his first professional fight on June 10, 1960, against Walter Giles at the Boston Garden in Boston, Massachusetts. His second match on July 19, 1960, he was matched up against Eddie Grenke at Veterans' Memorial Stadium in Quincy, Massachusetts. During his professional boxing career he weighed in between 144 and 145 pounds This match was Eddie Grenke's professional boxing debut. On October 31, 1961, he knocked out competitor Donald Mendes in Revere, Massachusetts, in 1:50 and won the match. His last winning match was on February 2, 1962, when he knocked out Gene Garrison. Rocco himself was knocked out by Tommy Thibault on November 17, 1961, in Worcester, Massachusetts, and again on January 9, 1962, in Revere by Jackie Lynch. His last professional boxing match was against Jesse Ammons on February 17, 1964, which he lost. His overall professional boxing record was three wins, four losses and one withdrawn match in a total of twenty-seven matches fought.

It is rumored by Howie Carr and former mobster Vincent Teresa that Rocco supplemented his petty boxer's income by being a prizefighter for members of the Patriarca crime family who had interests in illegal betting and professional sports. In 1964 he gave up his dreams of being a professional boxer entirely and became active in the Patriarca crime family. He was married to an Italian-American housewife and drove a burgundy 1962 Ford Thunderbird on a desolate street at night in his home city of Newton. He left behind a wife and no children.

Criminal career
In 1966 Stephen Flemmi, acting as an informant told FBI agent H. Paul Rico that Rocco was robbing illegal card and dice games. There had been two dice games and three high-stakes card games that were held up by DiSiglio within three weeks. The most recent brazen robbery was on April 9, 1966, when five men burst in on a dice game that was happening at an address on the corner of Morton and Blue Hill Avenue in Mattapan, Boston with Bernard Zinna and Richard DiVincent, armed with sawed-off shotguns. They were robbing lucrative card games that he controlled in his territory of Newton and Lowell, Massachusetts overseen by Gennaro Anguilo, gambling czar for the Patriarca crime family which at the time was headed by Raymond Patriarca. They robbed the players of an estimated $4,500. None of the individuals bothered to wear ski masks during and all appeared to be of Italian ethnic extraction. DiSiglio was the "inside man" who saw to it that the door was unlocked for Zinna and DeVincent to come in unannounced and surprise the card players. One of them made a comment to the card players, "Larry told you not to run." Flemmi advised the Federal Bureau of Investigation (FBI) that this was a reference to Ilario Zannino who oversaw a lucrative illegal barboot game that ran on Sundays in the neighborhood. One of the card players at this game had been relieved of $10,000 and he had just borrowed the money from a Jewish loan shark named "Richfield" in the North End, Boston so he could act as a loan shark at the high-stakes card game for unfortunate players.

Retaliation from Gennaro Anguilo
Patriarca crime family underboss and acting boss Gennaro Anguilo of the Angiulo Brothers quickly became infuriated with DiSiglio's maverick actions and robbing the patrons of his gambling operations.

In 1968, Patriarca crime family capo Gennaro Anguilo and two others were arrested and charged with first degree homicide but later acquitted. In August 1967, after H. Paul Rico testified before a Suffolk county grand jury about his conversations with Joseph Barboza concerning the murder of DiSiglio, the Boston SAC sent an urgent teletype to J. Edgar Hoover at 1:03 a.m. The Special Agent in charge noted that Suffolk County District Attorney Garret Bryne was commented that this "tremendous penetration into the La Cosa Nostra and the hoodlum element was effected through the outstanding investigative efforts of the FBI and his office." Joseph Barboza stated that Gennaro Anguilo summoned Bernard Zinna and Richard DeVincent and gave them a choice, to either carry out the murder of their former gang mastermind or be murdered themselves.

The following week, Zinna and DeVincent set up DiSiglio at a bar in East Boston, luring DiSiglio to ride with them. They drove over to a dark street and Mario exited the Thunderbird under the guise of picking up a stolen car for a robbery they had planned. As he sat in the driver's seat of his Ford Thunderbird Landau on a desolate street he was shot three times at close range in the head by DeVincent. They drove the car out to Danvers, Massachusetts, and left it in the woods. Shortly after his murder Joseph Barboza became a stool pigeon and he identified DiSiglio's triggermen as police officers in the Boston Police Department, including the murderers of Edward Deegan.

One bullet tore off part of DiSiglio's face, another went through his head and out an eye socket. The murderers drove to Topsfield, Massachusetts, and dumped the body in the Ipswich River Wildlife Sanctuary. Barboza told the jury that he knew this because the accused triggermen Zinna and Richard "Vinnie the Pig" DeVincent told him so after the slaying. DeVincent bragged about it. Barboza even went to see Gennaro Anguilo at his office: "I told him that Benny Zinna and Vinnie DeVincent told me that he gave the order to whack out Rocky DiSiglio or he would whack them out. The reason I wanted to know this was that DiSiglio was a friend of mine and to find out if he had done anything wrong on his part to be killed. I told Anguilo they were running at the mouth. That they came down and told me everything. Anguilo said that he would talk to Zinna and that he didn't trust 'the Pig.'" Joseph Barboza later revealed the location of where they had dumped DiSiglio's corpse to the police. They found him in the backseat of his Thunderbird in the woods abandoned outside of Danvers, Massachusetts. Soon after the charges against Bernard Zinna for his involvement in the murder of DiSiglio were dropped, he was executed gangland style by being shot twice in the back of his head as he sat in his own car by unknown gunmen. Homicide investigators were never able to charge anyone with the homicide, except Gennaro Anguilo most likely ordered his death for his mother who he allowed to give an interview to television reporter John Henning during the trial.

DeVincent was murdered by unknown members of the Patriarca crime family in Medford, Massachusetts, on April 3, 1996.

References
 The Underboss: The Rise and Fall of a Mafia Family by Gerard O'Neil and Dick Lehr

External links
 http://www.thebrothersbulger.com/Rocco%20DiSeglio.htm
 http://www.thebrothersbulger.com/Benjamin%20(Benny)%20Zinna.htm
 http://www.wrko.com/Whitey-Watch/975375
 http://www.boxrec.com/list_bouts.php?human_id=80847&cat=boxer

Sportspeople from Newton, Massachusetts
1966 deaths
American people of Italian descent
American gangsters of Italian descent
1939 births
American male boxers
Welterweight boxers